Tang Gewog is a gewog (village block) of Bumthang District, Bhutan.

References

Gewogs of Bhutan
Bumthang District